The enzyme polynucleotide 3′-phosphatase (EC 3.1.3.32) catalyzes the reaction

a 3′-phosphopolynucleotide + H2O  a polynucleotide + phosphate

This enzyme belongs to the family of hydrolases, specifically those acting on phosphoric monoester bonds.  The systematic name is polynucleotide 3'-phosphohydrolase. Other names in common use include 2′(3′)-polynucleotidase, DNA 3′-phosphatase, deoxyribonucleate 3′-phosphatase, and 5′-polynucleotidekinase 3′-phosphatase.

Structural studies

References

 

EC 3.1.3
Enzymes of known structure